Baxter Springs is a city in Cherokee County, Kansas, United States, and located along Spring River.  As of the 2020 census, the population of the city was 3,888.

History

For thousands of years, indigenous peoples had lived along the waterways throughout the west. The Osage migrated west from the Ohio River area of Kentucky, driven out by the Iroquois. They settled in Kansas by the mid-17th century, adopting Plains Indian traditions. They competed with other tribes and by 1750 they dominated much of what is now the region of Kansas, Missouri and Oklahoma.

One of the largest Osage bands was led by Chief Black Dog (Manka - Chonka). His men completed what became known as the Black Dog Trail by 1803. It started from their winter territory east of Baxter Springs and extended southwest to their summer hunting grounds at the Great Salt Plains in present-day Alfalfa County, Oklahoma. The Osage regularly stopped at the springs for healing on their way to summer hunting grounds. They made the trail by clearing it of brush and large rocks, and constructing earthen ramps to the fords. Wide enough for eight horsemen to ride abreast, the trail was the first improved road in Kansas and Oklahoma.

During the late 1830s and Indian Removal, the Cherokee people were among the Five Civilized Tribes forced out of the Southeast United States to west of the Mississippi River. This area was defined by the United States as part of their Cherokee Neutral Lands. A trading post was established at the springs. Some Native Americans and European-American settlers began to develop a community around the post. The 19th-century settlers eventually named the city and nearby springs after early settler A. Baxter. He had claimed land about 1850 and built a frontier tavern or inn.

During the American Civil War, the United States government built several rudimentary military posts at present-day Baxter Springs, fortifying what had been a trading post: Fort Baxter, Camp Ben Butler and Camp Hunter. This was to protect settlers against the Confederate regulars and partisan guerrillas operating in the eastern part of state.

On October 4, 1863, some 400 men of the pro-Southern Quantrill's raiders were passing on their way to Texas for the winter. They attacked Fort Blair. Some of the garrison was away from the fort on assignment. The remainder, mostly United States Colored Troops, held the fort with few casualties. Quantrill's men later encountered an unrelated detachment of 103 Union troops out on the prairie. The Confederates overwhelmed them, killing nearly all the Union men, including many after they were captured.

After temporarily reinforcing the fort, the United States abandoned the Baxter Springs area later that year. It moved its troops to the better fortified Fort Scott, Kansas. Before leaving, US forces tore down and destroyed Fort Baxter to make it unusable for hostiles.

Most of the town's growth took place after the war, when it began to develop at a rapid pace. By 1867, entrepreneurs had constructed a cable ferry across the Spring River, which was operated into the 1880s. At that time, it was replaced by the first bridge built across the river.

Around 1868 there was a great demand for beef in the North. Texas cattlemen and stock raisers drove large herds of cattle from the southern plains, and used Baxter Springs as a way point to the northern markets at Kansas City, which linked to railroads to the East. This led to the dramatic growth of Baxter Springs by the early 1870s as the first "cow town" in Kansas. By 1875, its population was estimated at 5,000.

The town organized the Stockyards and Drovers Association to buy and sell cattle. They constructed corrals for up to 20,000 head of cattle, supplied with ample grazing lands and fresh water. Texas cattle trade stimulated the growth of related businesses, and Baxter Springs grew rapidly. The town was regularly the rowdy gathering place of cowboys, and saloons, livery stables, brothels and hotels were developed to support their seasonal business. At the same time other settlers were building schools and churches, to support family life.

After railroads were constructed from the North into Texas later in the century, cattlemen no longer needed to conduct the cattle drives, or to use Baxter Springs as a way station to markets. The first railroad to enter Texas from the north, completed in 1872, was the  As ranchers started shipping their beef directly from Texas, business in Baxter Springs and other cow towns fell off sharply.

The discovery of lead in large veins in the tri-state area revived the area towns from the economic doldrums in the early twentieth century. In the early days of Baxter Springs, lead had been found in small quantities along Spring Creek, but it was of poor quality. It was suspected that higher grade ore could be found, but only at deeper depths. The Baxter Springs City Council by Ordinance 42 enacted provisions that greatly limited any mining within city limits. Their actions protected the land in the city; nearby towns have suffered from mining-related environmental degradation.

Baxter Springs certainly benefited from the business and revenues generated by regional mining activity. Many of the mine owners and operators built ambitious houses here to reflect their success. In addition, in the early 1900s many mining executives built their business offices in Baxter Springs. By the 1940s, however, much of the high-quality ore had been mined, and the industry declined in the region. Some towns became defunct, and Hockerville, Lincolnville, Douthit, Zincville and others disappeared. The mining practices of the time caused considerable environmental degradation in the region. Federal and state restoration efforts have helped to improve the land since the late twentieth century.

In 1926, the downtown main street was designated as part of the historic Route 66 transcontinental highway connecting Chicago and Los Angeles. The highway became known informally as America's "Main Street", because it used the main arteries of many cities. Designation as Route 66 stimulated related growth along the highway, including of motels and fast food places, and it gained a prominent place in popular culture.  Baxter Spring was one of only three towns through which Route 66 passed in Kansas.

Since the late 20th century, the town has reserved the land of Riverside Park along the Spring River. This has renewed the community's connection and preserved access to the river and its green banks.

2014 tornado

A tornado started near Quapaw, Oklahoma and moved through Baxter Springs on April 27, 2014.

Geography
Baxter Springs is located at  (37.023062, -94.734762). The city is sited on the western bank of the Spring River at the edge of the Ozarks, in the Spring River basin. U.S. Route 69 Alternate and U.S. Route 166 have a junction at the city, and U.S. Route 400 bypasses it to the northeast. The center of town is less than two miles (3 km) from the Kansas-Oklahoma state border, though the incorporated area of the city extends to the border.

Demographics

2010 census
As of the census of 2010, there were 4,238 people, 1,754 households, and 1,151 families residing in the city. The racial makeup of the city was 85.2% White, 0.8% African American, 6.2% Native American, 0.4% Asian, 1.4% Pacific Islander, 0.4% from other races, and 5.7% from two or more races. Hispanic or Latino of any race were 1.7% of the population.

There were 1,754 households, of which 33.1% had children under the age of 18 living with them, 47.9% were married couples living together, 12.7% had a female householder with no husband present, 5.0% had a male householder with no wife present, and 34.4% were non-families. 30.6% of all households were made up of individuals, and 14.6% had someone living alone who was 65 years of age or older. The average household size was 2.41 and the average family size was 2.99.

The median age in the city was 38 years. 26.1% of residents were under the age of 18; 8% were between the ages of 18 and 24; 25.1% were from 25 to 44; 25% were from 45 to 64; and 15.9% were 65 years of age or older. The gender makeup of the city was 48.6% male and 51.4% female.

2000 census
As of the 2000 census, there were 4,602 people, 1,860 households, and 1,246 families residing in the city. The racial makeup of the city was 88.03% White, 0.98% Black or African American, 5.04% Native American, 0.20% Asian, 0.17% Pacific Islander, 0.48% from other races, and 5.11% from two or more races. Hispanic or Latino of any race were 1.30% of the population.

There were 1,860 households, out of which 32.2% had children under the age of 18 living with them, 52.6% were married couples living together, 10.4% had a female householder with no husband present, and 33.0% were non-families. 29.7% of all households were made up of individuals, and 16.6% had someone living alone who was 65 years of age or older. The average household size was 2.44 and the average family size was 3.02.

In the city, the population was spread out, with 26.5% under the age of 18, 9.2% from 18 to 24, 26.7% from 25 to 44, 20.8% from 45 to 64, and 16.7% who were 65 years of age or older. The median age was 36 years. For every 100 females, there were 89.5 males. For every 100 females age 18 and over, there were 85.4 males.

The median income for a household in the city was $28,876, and the median income for a family was $33,933. Males had a median income of $27,005 versus $19,038 for females. The per capita income for the city was $13,789. About 9.3% of families and 10.2% of the population were below the poverty line, including 13.5% of those under age 18 and 12.4% of those age 65 or over.

Notable people
 Waylande Gregory (1905–1971), artist
 Richard Hilderbrand, member of the Kansas Senate
 Hale Irwin, (b1945), PGA golfer
 Charles Parham (1873-1929), Pentecostal leader
 Joe Rooney, (b1975), lead guitarist for country pop trio Rascal Flatts
 H. Lee Scott, Jr., (b1949), former President and CEO of Wal-Mart.
 Tim Shallenburger (b1954), former Kansas State Treasurer and Speaker of the Kansas House
 Byron Stewart (b1956), actor (The White Shadow, St. Elsewhere)
 Glad Youse (1898 – 1985), composer
 Max McCoy (b1958), journalist and author (Indiana Jones, Elevations)

Gallery
 Historic Images of Baxter Springs, Special Photo Collections at Wichita State University Library

References

Further reading

 Baxter Springs Centennial - The Baxter Springs Story - 100 Years, 1858-1958.; 1958.

External links

 City of Baxter Springs
 Baxter Springs - Directory of Public Officials
 USD 508, local school district
 Baxter Springs city map, KDOT

Cities in Kansas
Cities in Cherokee County, Kansas
1868 establishments in Kansas
Populated places established in 1868